Denis "Dinny" Heagney (13 April 1898 – 11 March 1942) was an Australian rules footballer who played with Geelong in the Victorian Football League (VFL).

Heagney, in just his fourth league game, was a follower in Geelong's 1925 premiership team. He played in the opening two rounds of the 1926 VFL season but didn't appear in any more games for Geelong.

He died on 11 March 1942.

References

External links
 
 

1898 births
Australian rules footballers from Victoria (Australia)
Geelong Football Club players
Geelong Football Club Premiership players
1942 deaths
One-time VFL/AFL Premiership players